The 2012 Prix de l'Arc de Triomphe was a horse race held at Longchamp on Sunday 7 October 2012. It was the 91st running of the Prix de l'Arc de Triomphe.

The winner was Solemia, a four-year-old filly trained in France by Carlos Laffon-Parias. The winning jockey was Olivier Peslier.

In the closing stages of the race, Orfevre seemed likely to become the first winner of the event for Japan. But Solemia, an outsider in the betting, passed the leader in the home straight.

Race details
 Sponsor: Qatar Racing and Equestrian Club
 Purse: €4,000,000; First prize: €2,285,600 
 Going: Heavy
 Distance: 2,400 metres
 Number of runners: 18
 Winner's time: 2m 37.68s

Full result

 Abbreviations: nse = nose; nk = neck; hd = head; dist = distance

Winner's details
Further details of the winner, Solemia.
 Sex: Filly
 Foaled: 20 February 2008
 Country: Ireland
 Sire: Poliglote; Dam: Brooklyn's Dance (Shirley Heights)
 Owner: Wertheimer et Frère
 Breeder: Wertheimer et Frère

Subsequent breeding careers
Leading progeny of participants in the 2012 Prix de l'Arc de Triomphe.

Sires of Classic winners
Orfevre (2nd)
 Epoca d'Oro - 1st Satsuki Shō (2018)
 Lucky Lilac - 1st Queen Elizabeth II Cup (2019)
 Authority - 1st Aoba Sho (2020)
 Gilded Mirror - 3rd NHK Mile Cup (2020)
Camelot (7th)
 Latrobe - 1st Irish Derby (2018)
 Even So - 1st Irish Oaks (2020)
 Athena - 1st Belmont Oaks (2018)
 Sir Erec - 1st Spring Juvenile Hurdle (2019)

Other Stallions
Masterstroke (3rd) - Floridee - (1st Prix Bournosienne 2018)Saonois (15th) - Minor flat and jumps winnersSea Moon (8th) - Minor flat runnerMeandre (12th) - Exported to Czech RepublicMikhail Glinka (14th) - Exported to Czech Republic

Broodmares
Great Heavens (6th) - Dubhe - Listed class handicapperSolemia (1st) - Minor flat winnerHaya Landa (4th) - Minor winner in JapanYellow And Green (5th) - Minor flat winnerShareta (9th) - Minor flat runners

References

External links
 Colour Chart – Arc 2012

Prix de l'Arc de Triomphe
 2012
2012 in French sport
2012 in Paris
October 2012 sports events in France